An elemental diet is a diet that proposes the ingestion, or in more severe cases use of a gastric feeding tube or intravenous feeding, of liquid nutrients in an easily assimilated form. It is usually composed of amino acids, fats, sugars, vitamins, and minerals. This diet, however, lacks whole or partial protein due to its ability to cause an allergic reaction in some people.

Effectiveness 

There is no good evidence that elemental diets are effective in treating chronic pouchitis.

There is some evidence that an elemental diet may be useful in inducing remission in people with small intestinal bacterial overgrowth. Elemental diet is most often prescribed to patients who cannot tolerate antibiotics or have failed to respond to antibiotic treatment since the diet is restrictive and can be unpalatable or costly.

Description 

The elemental diet consists of a mixture of essential amino acids with non-essential amino acids, fat, and sugars. Water-soluble vitamins, fat-soluble vitamins, and electrolytes are often added. The elemental diet is sometimes introduced over a period of three days to patients, successively increasing in strength on each day to reduce the likelihood of diarrhea and abdominal colic. It can be given orally or through nasogastric tubes if patients are intolerant to the liquid.

Adverse effects
Many patients are unable to tolerate the taste, even if the diet is flavored, and choose to receive it through intragastric administration. Possible nausea and diarrhea can result from the high sugar content which can also complicate hyperglycaemia in patients with pre-existing diabetes. As a result of suppression of healthy bacteria, via a loss of bacterial food source, prolonged use of an elemental diet elevates the risk of developing clostridium difficile infection/colonisation.

See also 
 List of diets
 Medical food

References

Diets